Sir Henry Edward Bolte GCMG (20 May 1908 – 4 January 1990) was an Australian politician who served as the 38th Premier of Victoria. To date he is the longest-serving Victorian premier, having been in office for over 17 consecutive years.

Early years 
Henry Bolte was born in Ballarat, the son of a publican of German descent. He was to spend the first 24 years of his life (apart from three years at boarding school) in the small Western District town of Skipton. He was educated at Skipton Primary School and Ballarat Grammar School: to date, he was the last Victorian Premier not to attend a university. After working in various manual jobs he married Edith Elder in 1934 and bought a small farm called 'Kialla' at Bamganie near Meredith, where he lived for the rest of his life, running sheep and cattle.

In 1940 Bolte joined the Australian Army and served as a sergeant with a training regiment until 1945. After the war he returned to farming and became active in the newly formed Liberal Party. At the 1945 election he stood unsuccessfully for the Victorian Legislative Assembly in the Western District seat of Hampden, but in 1947 he stood again and was elected.

Parliamentary career 

Victorian politics was volatile at this time, with a succession of weak short-term governments. The electoral system was malapportioned in favour of rural areas, which gave the Liberals' junior partner, the Country Party disproportionate power. As a rural Liberal, Bolte despised the Country Party nearly as much as the Labor Party. In April 1935, Country Party leader and Deputy Premier Albert Dunstan unexpectedly withdrew support for the Premier, Stanley Argyle, breaking the coalition agreement and forming a minority Country government, which Labor supported in return for some policy concessions.

When Bolte was elected to Parliament in 1947 the Liberal leader was Thomas Hollway, who also came from Ballarat but was somewhat less conservative than Bolte. In 1951 Hollway tried to reform the electoral system, which caused a split in the Liberal Party and his replacement by Les Norman, with Bolte as Deputy Leader. Norman would lose his seat to Hollway in 1952, and be replaced as leader by Trevor Oldham. When Oldham was killed on BOAC Flight 783 in May 1953, Bolte succeeded him.

The Labor Party under John Cain senior had come to power at the 1952 elections, but in 1955 the party suffered a split over the issue of communist influence in the trade unions. With Cain's government reeling, Bolte tabled a no-confidence motion on 19 April. The anti-communist Catholic MPs, who had organised as the Australian Labor Party (Anti-Communist), crossed the floor to support the no-confidence motion, bringing Cain down.

Due in large part to Labor (A-C) directing its second preferences to the Liberals, Bolte won the ensuing election with a huge majority, routing both Labor and the Country Party. There was little hint at the time that he would reverse the pattern of unstable government in Victoria; he headed the state's 11th government in 12 years. However, he was able to form the first stable non-Labor government in Victoria for many years.

Bolte was a rough-hewn politician who liked to be seen as a simple farmer, but he had a shrewd political mind.  With the help of the expelled faction of the Labor Party, which became the Democratic Labor Party, Bolte was able to consolidate his position. Due in part to the DLP continuing to direct its preferences to the Liberals at elections, Bolte was reelected six times. His populist attacks on the trade unions, intellectuals, protesters and the press won him a large following. It peaked at the 1967 election, which saw the opposition reduced to just 28 seats (16 Labor and 12 Country) in total.

Infrastructure building
Bolte used state debt to provide a wide range of state infrastructure and he was very successful at winning overseas investment for the state. Some of his large projects were increased coal production and power generation in the Latrobe Valley, new offshore oil and gas fields in Gippsland, the West Gate Bridge over the lower Yarra River, a new international airport for Melbourne at Tullamarine and two new universities (Monash University and La Trobe University). Bolte was easily re-elected at the 1958, 1961 and 1964 state elections.

Capital punishment controversy 
Bolte was a proponent of using capital punishment as a deterrent against violent crime. Many believed he was foiled when Robert Peter Tait who had murdered Ada Hall, an elderly widow, at the Hawthorn vicarage where she lived with her son and who had been sentenced to hang for the crime, was granted an eleventh-hour reprieve in 1962 after the High Court had found him insane.

Justice Starke subscribed to the substitute Tait theory, Starke had defended Tait but later on was the sentencing judge in the R v Ryan & Walker 1966. Starke said  After Bolte was denied with Tait he simply waited for the next cab off the ranks, and poor Ryan happened to be the next cab! 

In 1967, Bolte would not be denied; in 1965, two prisoners, Ronald Ryan and Peter Walker, had escaped from Melbourne's Pentridge Prison, allegedly killing a prison guard in the process. They were recaptured, and Ryan was sentenced to death for murder.
Bolte had the power to recommend clemency, but declined to exercise it, arguing that the death penalty was a necessary deterrent for crime against government officials and law enforcement officers.

All calls for clemency, petitions and protests were to no avail. Bolte was determined that the law be upheld. Ryan was hanged in February 1967. Bolte had said "If I thought the law was wrong I would change it".

A reporter at his daily press conference on the day of the hanging asked what he was doing at the time it took place. Bolte, replied: "One of the three Ss, I suppose." The reporter asked him what he meant. Bolte responded: "A shit, a shave or a shower."
 
Bolte's insistence on having Ryan hanged earned him the opposition of the Melbourne press, particularly The Age, the churches, the universities and most of the legal profession. It also alienated sections of the Liberal Party and some members of his own Cabinet, including his eventual successor, Dick Hamer. But Bolte had correctly interpreted the populist appeal of his law-and-order stand, and at the 1967 elections the Liberals gained six seats. The Liberals went from 38 of 66 seats in 1964 to 44 of 73 in 1967.

Later career 

After 1968, when Bolte turned 60, his appeal to younger urban voters declined, and he showed little sympathy with new issues such as the environment and civil liberties. His standing was also reduced by a crisis in the state education system, with teacher shortages and overcrowded schools as the children of the baby boom passed through the education system. The government recruited large numbers of American schoolteachers to deal with the shortage. At the same time the Labor Party began to revive under a new leader, Clyde Holding.

At the 1970 state elections the Liberals seemed in serious danger of losing office, or at least being forced into a coalition with the Country Party, but Bolte was saved by Holding's left-wing enemies in the Labor Party, who sabotaged his campaign by publicly opposing government funding for non-government schools (which Holding and Gough Whitlam had made Labor policy). Nevertheless, the Liberals lost six seats.

Bolte was promoted to Knight Grand Cross of the Order of St Michael and St George (GCMG) in the 1972 New Year Honours.
Bolte on various occasions asked the prime minister, William McMahon, to approach the British authorities to have Bolte made a life peer of the UK Parliament. McMahon needed Bolte's political support, so he wrote to 10 Downing Street with a proposal, but it was declined.

As 1972 dawned, the Liberals lost further ground among younger voters in Melbourne. Bolte was shrewd enough to see that the Liberals had a year at most to broaden their appeal before a statutory general election, and concluded that they needed a new leader and a new image for the 1970s. In August 1972 he resigned, apparently with no regrets. He arranged for Deputy Premier Dick Hamer, a somewhat more progressive Melbourne-based Liberal, to succeed him. Despite misgivings from the more conservative wing of the party, Hamer was elected as Liberal leader and premier. This proved a sound judgement, since Hamer went on to win three more elections for the Liberals.

Retirement and death

Retirement 
After his resignation and retirement from Parliament, Bolte retired to his farm, 'Kialla', at Bamganie, near Meredith. Liberals in the Opposition would visit Bolte at his farm, "whisky bottle in hand, seeking consolation and advice." Bolte was deeply affected by the sudden death of his wife, Dame Edith, in 1986.

Drink driving controversy 
On 24 March 1984, Bolte was involved in a serious head-on accident when he was driving home after an evening in the local hotel near his property at Bamganie. Bolte and the occupants of the other car were taken to the Ballarat Base Hospital, where blood samples were taken to test for alcohol levels. Whilst there was no evidence of alcohol in the blood of the other driver involved, there were indications of an alcohol content in excess of 0.05%, the legal limit in Victoria, in Bolte's blood. Further samples were subsequently collected from the hospital by the police, but these were found to have been substituted, and the sample box containing them had been unlocked by an unknown person. An enquiry found that it would have been unfair to proceed with prosecution because of interference with the evidence. Bolte later told author Tom Prior "Of course I know nothing, I was unconscious".

Death 
Bolte died at home on 4 January 1990.

Honours and memorials 
Bolte was appointed a Knight Commander of the Order of St. Michael and St. George (KCMG) in the New Year's Day honours list of 1966. In the 1972 New Year Honours he was advanced to the rank of Knight Grand Cross (GCMG). Despite "his intense lobbying", Bolte failed to secure a peerage.

His wife, Lady Edith Lilian Bolte, known as Jill Bolte, was appointed a Dame Commander of the Order of the British Empire in the 1973 New Year Honours for "outstanding public service to Victoria".

A portrait of Bolte by William Dargie hangs in Queens Hall at Parliament House Victoria.

Bridge 

The Bolte Bridge that spans Melbourne's Docklands is named after him.

Further reading
Tom Prior, Bolte by Bolte (Craftsman Publishing, 1990) 
Peter Blazey, Bolte: a Political Biography (Mandarin Press, 1990)

References

Further reading 

 "Sir Henry Bolte", The Times (London), 8 January 1990, p. 18.

Premiers of Victoria
1908 births
1990 deaths
People from Ballarat
Australian Army officers
Australian people of German descent
Members of the Victorian Legislative Assembly
Victorian Ministers for the Environment
Liberal Party of Australia members of the Parliament of Victoria
Australian Knights Grand Cross of the Order of St Michael and St George
Australian politicians awarded knighthoods
Leaders of the Opposition in Victoria (Australia)
Treasurers of Victoria
20th-century Australian politicians
Australian Army personnel of World War II